Bweyogerere is one of the six townships or wards that constitute Kira Municipality in Wakiso District in southern central Uganda. The other five wards are Kimwaanyi, Kira, Kireka, Kirinnya and Kyaliwajjala.

Location
 The coordinates of the township are:0°21'09.0"N 32°39'49.0"E (Latitude:0.352500; Longitude:32.663611).

Overview
Mandela National Stadium is located in the southwestern corner of Bweyogerere, on the southern side of the Kampala–Jinja Highway. Kampala Industrial and Business Park, one of the designated industrial areas within the greater Kampala Metropolitan Area is in Namanve, to the east and southeast of Bweyogerere. The Kampala Northern Bypass Highway, a  dual carriageway road forming an arc around the northern half of the city of Kampala, leaves the Kampala-Jinja Highway at Bweyogerere and begins a winding journey that ends in Busega on the Kampala–Mityana Road.

Population
During the 2002 national census, Bweyogerere constituted 26.7 percent of the population of Kira Municipality. In 2014, the national household and population census enumerated the population of Kira Municipality at 317,157.

Points of interest
The following additional points of interest lie within Bweyogerere township or close to its borders:

(2) Bweyogerere central market. (3) Bweyogerere Mosque. (4) Kampala-Jinja Highway traverses the township in an east/west direction. (5) Railway line traversing the neighborhood in a west to east direction.

See also
 Central Region, Uganda
 Kira Town

References

External links
About Bweyogerere
About Bweyogerere Mosque
 Aerial View of Mandela National Stadium

Populated places in Central Region, Uganda
Cities in the Great Rift Valley
Populated places on Lake Victoria
Kira Town